Perkins (also Perkins Station) is a census-designated place and unincorporated community in Jenkins County, Georgia, United States. As of the 2010 census it had a population of 91.

Demographics

See also

 List of census-designated places in Georgia (U.S. state)
 Central Savannah River Area

References

External links

 Old Buckhead Church historical marker

Census-designated places in Jenkins County, Georgia
Census-designated places in Georgia (U.S. state)
Unincorporated communities in Georgia (U.S. state)